This is a list of individuals who are or were natives of, or notable as residents of, or in association with the city of Lafayette, Louisiana, United States.

Notable residents

Natives
Some of the notable people that were born in Lafayette:
Danneel Ackles, television actress, One Tree Hill
Felecia Angelle, anime voice-over actress
Fernest Arceneaux (deceased), zydeco musician
Nnamdi Asomugha, NFL defensive back
Paul Bako, catcher in Major League Baseball for the Cincinnati Reds
Marc Breaux, choreographer of movies such as Mary Poppins, The Sound of Music, and Chitty Chitty Bang Bang
Jefferson Caffery (deceased), former U.S. ambassador
Mark Carrier, former NFL wide receiver
Irvin Castille, Negro American League player for the Birmingham Black Barons
Daniel Cormier, Olympic wrestler and former UFC Light Heavyweight and Heavyweight Champion
Cupid, R&B singer; known for writing the "Cupid Shuffle"
Lauren Daigle, Grammy-winning singer
Walter Davis, triple jump athlete
Michael Doucet, Cajun musician
Armand Duplantis, Olympic-champion pole vaulter representing Sweden
Kevin Faulk, NFL running back
Ron Guidry, MLB pitcher
Hunter Hayes, country musician
Jimmy Hayes, former member of the United States House of Representatives from the since disbanded 7th congressional district
Lionel Hebert, professional golfer
Alan Jouban, MMA fighter
Richard Keith, born Keith Thibodeaux, known for playing "Little Ricky" on I Love Lucy
Angela Kinsey, television actress, The Office
Lash Leroux, professional wrestler, illustrator for Pro Wrestling Illustrated and other wrestling magazines
Mikie Mahtook, MLB outfielder and first round draft pick; currently plays for the Detroit Tigers
Gil Meche, MLB pitcher, Kansas City Royals
R.J. Mitte, actor with cerebral palsy, supporting actor in Breaking Bad
Alfred Mouton, Civil War general
Ann McBride Norton (1944–2020), activist and business executive
Kim Perrot (1967–1999), WNBA basketball player
Dustin Poirier, former interim UFC Lightweight Champion
Addison Rae (born 2000), American social media personality, dancer, actress and singer
Joe Walker, zydeco musician
Brett Weaver, anime voiceover actor; mostly known for his work with ADV Films
Gus Weill, political consultant, television host, novelist, playwright, poet, born in Lafayette in 1933
Domanick Williams, NFL running back
Jessica Zajicek, former PA of Kathy Griffin; starring in Kathy Griffin: My Life on the D-List
Summrs, rapper

Residents
Other notable current and/or former residents of Lafayette:
C. C. Adcock, musician, producer
Royd Anderson, filmmaker
Kevyn Aucoin (deceased), professional makeup artist
Ray Authement (born 1928), president of the University of Louisiana at Lafayette, 1974–2008
Jamie Baldridge (born 1975), visual artist, writer
Carl W. Bauer (1933–2013), member of both houses of the Louisiana State Legislature; lobbyist for the University of Louisiana at Lafayette, 1990–2010 
Henri Willis Bendel, fashion designer and entrepreneur
Captain Steven L. Bennett, posthumous Vietnam War Medal of Honor recipient
Kathleen Blanco, former Louisiana governor
Roy Bourgeois, priest and founder of human rights group SOA Watch
Marc Broussard, musician
James Lee Burke, mystery novelist, Pulitzer Prize nominee
Kody Chamberlain, comic book writer and artist
Jermall Charlo, boxer, IBF Junior Middleweight Champion
Jermell Charlo, boxer, WBC Super Welterweight Champion
Hollis Conway, Olympic medalist
Albert H. Crews, astronaut
Charles B. DeBellevue, highest-scoring American flying ace during the Vietnam War
Jefferson J. DeBlanc, World War II flying ace and Medal of Honor recipient
Jake Delhomme, NFL quarterback
David Egan (deceased), musician
Ernest Gaines, fiction author, Pulitzer Prize nominee
Deirdre Gogarty, world champion boxer 
Hedwig Gorski, poet and writer
Amy Guidry, surrealist painter
Leigh Hennessy, world champion gymnast and movie/TV stuntwoman
Clay Higgins, member of the U.S. House of Representatives for Louisiana's 3rd congressional district, former reserve deputy marshal of Lafayette known as the "Cajun John Wayne"
Sammy Kershaw, country & western musician
Bennett Landreneau, U.S. Army major general
Ali Landry, former Miss USA, model and actress
John L. Loos (deceased), American historian; Louisiana State University professor; spent last years in Lafayette, where he died in 2011 
Eugene J. Martin (deceased), visual artist originally from Washington D.C.
Alex McCool, manager of NASA Space Shuttle Projects Office
Elizabeth McNulty, Miss Louisiana 2007
Mildred Methvin, former U.S. Magistrate Judge, interim judge of the Louisiana 27th Judicial District Court in St. Landry Parish, 2014  
Brian Mitchell, former NFL running back, special teams returner
Elemore Morgan, Jr. (deceased), professor and visual artist
Paul Prudhomme, chef
Robert Rauschenberg (deceased), artist, National Medal of Arts winner
Zachary Richard, musician
George Rodrigue, artist, The Blue Dog
Chanda Rubin, USTA tennis player
Clifford Schoeffler, U.S. Air Force general
J. Minos Simon, attorney, author, sportsman
Richard Simmons, exercise guru
Brandon Stokley, NFL wide receiver
Daniel Sunjata, film, television, and Tony Award-nominated stage actor
Sam H. Theriot, Louisiana state representative from Vermilion Parish from 1979 to 1996, subsequently relocated to Lafayette 
Hugh Thompson, Jr., hero of My Lai, helicopter pilot
John Kennedy Toole (deceased), author of the Pulitzer Prize-winning novel A Confederacy of Dunces
A. Hays Town, architect
Javon Walker, NFL wide receiver
Tyler James Williams, actor

Notable local politicians
Gerald Boudreaux, state senator for Lafayette, St. Landry, and St. Martin parishes; director of Lafayette city parks and recreation department
Page Cortez, District 43 state representative since 2008
John Malcolm Duhé, Jr. (born 1933), retired U.S. district and appellate court judge
Joey Durel (born 1953), former mayor-president of Lafayette consolidated government (2004–2016)
Richard T. Haik (born 1950), United States District Judge for the Western District of Louisiana, based in Lafayette since 1991
Roderick Miller (deceased), first Republican member of the Louisiana House of Representatives from Lafayette since Reconstruction
Vincent Pierre (born 1964), state representative for Lafayette Parish since 2012

See also
List of University of Louisiana at Lafayette people
List of people from Louisiana

References

Lafayette, Louisiana
 
Lafayette